Nery Gustavo Kennedy Rolón (born May 28, 1973) is a javelin thrower from Paraguay, who represented his native country at two Summer Olympics (1992 and 2000). He briefly held the South American record for the Javelin Throw with a result of 81.28m, thrown on 9 May 1998, overtaking compatriot Edgar Baumann at the time. The mark stood until 1999, when compatriot Baumann threw 84.70 metres. In 2008, he worked as a coach in Canada with Frédérick Bouchard. He achieved the Texas A&M Javelin Throw record in 1994. Kennedy was coached by Juan De La Garza at Texas A&M in 1996.

Achievements

International competitions

National competitions

Personal best
 Javelin Throw: 81.28m  College Station, Texas – 9 May 1998

Seasonal bests
According to IAAF Profile.
1992 – 65.00
1994 – 76.70
1996 – 74.12
1997 – 75.08
1998 – 81.28
1999 – 78.89
2000 – 77.74
2001 – 76.04
2002 – 74.89
2003 – 75.53
2004 – 72.23
2005 – 70.03
2007 – 71.79
2008 – 76.66
2010 – 68.89
2011 – 61.50
2012 – 65.69

References

External links

Profile

1973 births
Living people
Paraguayan male javelin throwers
Athletes (track and field) at the 1992 Summer Olympics
Athletes (track and field) at the 2000 Summer Olympics
Athletes (track and field) at the 1995 Pan American Games
Athletes (track and field) at the 1999 Pan American Games
Athletes (track and field) at the 2003 Pan American Games
Olympic athletes of Paraguay
Pan American Games competitors for Paraguay
South American Games gold medalists for Paraguay
South American Games medalists in athletics
Competitors at the 1994 South American Games
Competitors at the 1998 South American Games